Alum Crest High School was a public high school located in Columbus, Ohio.  It was part of Columbus City Schools. Designed to meet the needs of emotionally disturbed students, Alum Crest High School prepared young men and women to successfully achieve the goal of graduating from Columbus Public Schools. However, the school was sold in March 2015 and merged with Clearbrook Middle School, and together are now Columbus Scioto 6–12.

Notes and references

External links
 District Website

High schools in Columbus, Ohio
Public high schools in Ohio